Ancistrus occloi is a species of catfish in the family Loricariidae. It is a freshwater fish native to South America, where it occurs in the Urubamba River basin in Peru. The species reaches 11.6 cm (4.6 inches) SL and is noted to inhabit high-altitude areas.

References 

occloi
Freshwater fish of South America
Fish described in 1928
Catfish of South America